

 is a retired Japanese boxer who is a former WBC junior flyweight champion.

Tomori won the Japan's inter-high school championship in the 45 kg class in 1977, and compiled an amateur record of 16–4 (3 KOs) before turning professional. Hitoshi Misako who is the president of Misako Boxing Gym in Tokyo went to Okinawa, and encouraged Tomori to turn professional. After joining that gym in 1978, he made his professional debut at the Korakuen Hall in May of that year.

In March 1979, Tomori won the annual Japanese boxing series, All-Japan Rookie King Tournament in the junior flyweight division. Although he lost on points to Kazunori Tenryū in the Japanese junior flyweight title bout in November 1979, he knocked out the sixteen-time defending champion Tenryū in the first round of the return match in February 1980 to capture the title. However he lost on points to Shūichi Hozumi in his second defense in August of that year. He competed with Masaharu Inami for the vacated title, but it also ended in a failure.

Originally Tomori was an out-fighter who excelled in the speed and skill. During his professional career, he had almost mastered the in-fighting to be spotlighted. However his transformation into an in-fighter was still incomplete. So, his manager Misako made him go to the temple for the sitting meditation practice in order to discipline his mind. Tomori regained the vacant Japanese title via a close decision in October 1981, and defended it once via a unanimous decision in his first professional fight in his hometown of Naha. At that time, Misako sensed that Tomori got a boost of energy, and set a world title shot for him.

On April 13, 1982, Tomori was scheduled to fight against Amado Ursúa for the WBC junior flyweight title at the Korakuen Hall. He trained under the guidance of Eddie Townsend who signed a deal with Misako Boxing Gym in March of that year. After the champion's pre-fight open workout, Koichi Wajima, Tomori's senior in the same gym, commented that he wondered if Tomori could sustain himself for three rounds. Nevertheless, he built a lead over Ursúa until the middle of the fight throwing his sharp right crosses and left jabs. In the later rounds Ursúa fought back fiercely, but was dethroned via a split decision. Ursúa expressed dissatisfaction to the decision.

His first defense against Hilario Zapata was initially scheduled in Panama City on June 5, 1982. However it was postponed to July 20 and moved to the Ishikawa Sangyō Hall in Kanazawa, Ishikawa due to Tomori's rib injury. In that first defense, Tomori lost to Zapata via a split decision. Misako protested the decision of the judges to the WBC, and Tomori had a rematch with Zapata as a challenger at the Kuramae Kokugikan on November 30 of the same year. However Tomori who had believed his own victory in the previous fight, told that he would not be able to fight more than he did on July 20. He suffered a cut above his left eye from the sixth round, and was stopped in the eighth round after being floored in the seventh and eighth rounds. Some time after that fight, Tomori retired.

See also
 List of WBC world champions
 List of light-flyweight boxing champions
 List of Japanese boxing world champions
 Boxing in Japan

References

Bibliography

External links
 

1959 births
Japanese male boxers
Living people
People from Okinawa Prefecture
World Boxing Council champions
World boxing champions
World light-flyweight boxing champions